Tristychius (from  , 'three' and   'row') is an extinct genus of shark from the Carboniferous period (Visean). Fossils of T. arcuatus, the type and only species, including fin spines have been found in Scotland.

It had a well-developed upturned caudal fin, similar to that of many modern sharks. Physically it may have resembled a modern dogfish. Tristychius also had spikes attached to the bases of its dorsal fins, probably for protection against predators.

References

Fossil taxa described in 1837
Carboniferous sharks
Carboniferous fish of Europe
Taxa named by Louis Agassiz